Chante Black (born November 12, 1985) is an American professional basketball player. She most recently played for the San Antonio Silver Stars of the WNBA.

High school
Born in Austin, Texas, Black played for East Forsyth High School in Kernersville, North Carolina, where she was named a WBCA All-American. She participated in the 2004 WBCA High School All-America Game where she scored three points.

Duke statistics
Source

WNBA
Black was selected the first round of the 2009 WNBA Draft (10th overall) by the Connecticut Sun.

Notes 

1985 births
Living people
All-American college women's basketball players
American expatriate basketball people in Australia
American expatriate basketball people in China
American women's basketball players
Basketball players from North Carolina
Basketball players from Austin, Texas
Centers (basketball)
Connecticut Sun draft picks
Connecticut Sun players
Duke Blue Devils women's basketball players
San Antonio Stars players
Shandong Six Stars players
Tulsa Shock players